Two Pints of Lager and a Packet of Crisps is a British television sitcom that ran from 26 February 2001 to 24 May 2011. First broadcast on BBC Two, it starred Sheridan Smith, Will Mellor, Natalie Casey, Ralf Little, Kathryn Drysdale and, later on in season 9, Luke Gell. The show was created and written by Susan Nickson and set in her hometown of Runcorn, Cheshire, it originally revolved around the lives of five twentysomethings. Little departed after the sixth series, and Smith and Drysdale left after the eighth series. The ninth and final series had major changes with new main cast members and new writers.

The core cast was augmented by various recurring characters throughout the series, portrayed by Beverley Callard, Lee Oakes, Hayley Bishop, Thomas Nelstrop, Freddie Hogan and Georgia Henshaw. The title was inspired by the 1980 song "Two Pints of Lager and a Packet of Crisps Please" by Splodgenessabounds. On 23 July 2011, it was confirmed that the series would not return due to the BBC making room for new comedies and feeling that the series had come to a natural end after the departures of most of the main cast members.

Background
The BBC's Head of Comedy and original executive producer of the show, Geoffrey Perkins, saw writer Susan Nickson's work on Channel 4's Lloyd's Bank Film Challenge, entitled "Life's A Bitch", which starred Sean Hughes and Kathy Burke. At age 14, Nickson was asked by Perkins to come and work with the BBC after a few years, and she created Two Pints when she was 18.

The BBC tried to persuade the producers of the Channel 4 soap opera Hollyoaks to get Will Mellor and Natalie Casey to work with them when they appeared in the show. Ralf Little and Sheridan Smith were cast soon after completing work on another BBC sitcom, The Royle Family. Although initially reluctant, Little agreed to audition when he realised that Two Pints would be very different from The Royle Family. Kathryn Drysdale was brought in after producers saw her perform at drama school.

The show's unaired pilot starred Little and Mellor, though the characters of Janet, Louise, and Donna were portrayed by Clare Buckfield, Lucy Punch, and Maxine Peake. Little and Smith play couple Jonny and Janet, alongside Mellor and Casey as Gaz and Donna. The latter two had previously portrayed a couple in Hollyoaks. Smith also considered herself lucky that she had already worked with Little before, as playing such a close couple would have been awkward for both. Mellor stated in an interview how he sees Casey as a younger sister, which made kissing scenes awkward. Smith also classes Casey as the "mummy" in the show, due to her knowledge and problem-solving skills. Typically, episodes end with a particularly dramatic scene, such as Jonny breaking the news to Janet that her parents turned down his request for her hand in marriage.

BBC Two broadcast the first series, while BBC Choice screened the second series but was re-branded as BBC Three shortly before it screened the third series, and showed the first run of each new series from then on. BBC Two also repeated the show, though only once, every Thursday. Series four ended with Jonny being shot by armed police and viewers were asked to vote, by text or phone, on his fate. Series 5 began with a funeral, but it was revealed to be that of Donna's mother. Some series are accompanied by a special programme featuring bloopers. The show, titled Two Pints of Lager Outtakes, features interviews with cast and crew, each explaining the difficulties of getting various scenes to be performed as expected. Multiple of these special blooper episodes were made.

The outcome of the final episode of series 8 was decided by the public, who were asked to vote on whether Gaz should be with Donna or Janet. Following the finale of series 8, which was broadcast on 10 May 2009, the audience chose Donna with 76.9% of the vote. The final episode concluded with Donna at Gaz's bedside.

Although Two Pints is largely comedic, it sometimes (especially at the end of a series) becomes more dramatic and serious. Such cliffhangers have included Janet and Jonny's split, Jonny being shot, Gaz's coma, and Janet's imminent departure to be a cruise singer. Will Mellor has described the show as being "driven by sex and alcohol" and the show is known for its adult and sometimes scatological humour, mostly involving references to sex and bodily functions. Vulgar language is also freely used, except for the word "fuck", which is uttered only once during the last episode of each series.

Series
The first six series with the original cast including Ralf Little ran until 2006 when Little said he would not return to the series. Will Mellor hinted at the series continuation in television interviews, one being Loose Women, and more or less confirming it on The Paul O'Grady Show. Little announced during an interview for This Morning on 19 September 2007 that he would not be returning for the following series due to an overwhelming schedule, and Jonny was therefore killed off-screen in the first episode of the seventh series.

An eighth series was confirmed by Mellor in an interview in the Metro on 21 April 2008, in which he said that they would be filming the series from November 2008 to January 2009. In January 2009, the BBC announced recording dates for the next series at BBC Television Centre from 1 February to 3 April. A special edition for Comic Relief was also recorded on 25 January. The eighth series began airing on 8 March 2009 starting with a Comic Relief special, which featured characters from Coming of Age and Grownups, as a curtain raiser, with subsequent episodes as normal. Natalie Casey, Kathryn Drysdale, Luke Gell, Will Mellor and Sheridan Smith all returned and the new character of Wesley was played by Thomas Nelstrop.

Two special episodes of Two Pints of Lager and a Packet of Crisps were filmed in 2009. The first was set a few minutes after the ending of the previous episode, its cast being limited to Janet, Wesley and Tim, and was recorded on 13 August 2009 at BBC TV Centre. It was a musical extravaganza set entirely inside the Archer and was broadcast on 15 December 2009. The second, "Sliding Gaz", was recorded on 18 August 2009 and shown on 22 December 2009. The cast consists of Donna and Gaz only and shows Donna in a "sliding doors" technique, imagining Gaz being healthy and also paralysed.

In April 2010, it was revealed that the show was to return, albeit 'refreshed' by the BBC, which could mean cast changes, and the loss of the creator of the show, Susan Nickson, who is reportedly moving on to work in America. Location filming for series 9 is set to begin in Runcorn on 25 January as reported in The Runcorn Weekly News. To celebrate the tenth anniversary of the show the official BBC website uploaded many of the viewers' favourite clips as well as Will Mellor and Natalie Casey presenting a 5-minute video about the 10 things you didn't know about the show. A plot summary of the new 2011 Ninth Series was then revealed by the BBC. Original cast members Sheridan Smith and Kathryn Drysdale announced in 2010 that they would not be returning to the show. They were written out of the series and their departures were mentioned in the first episode of series 9. On 23 July 2011, following a decline in ratings and feeling the series had come to a natural end following the departures of half of the main cast members the BBC decided that the show would not return for a tenth series.

In 2020, Will Mellor announced he wanted to bring the series back for a one-off special in 2021 to celebrate 20 years of the show, reuniting and featuring the original cast including Ralf Little whose character had been killed off in series 6. However, due to COVID-19 and unable to reunite the whole cast this never came into production. Mellor and Little later reunited and starred in their own podcast series “Two Pints With Will & Ralph”. The podcast was somewhat successful with the duo touring the show in 2022.

in a 2022 interview speaking about the potential of the series returning, Mellor said. “Fans are going mad for it, so we've got the audience. It's called Two Pints: Last Orders. It's revamped, it's really funny," he explained. "It's been brought up to the modern day but Gaz and Johnny are still very old school and sit in the pub talking about pies and beer. The BBC said no, they don't want to revisit Two Pints," Mellor admitted, before explaining that he and Nickson aren't going to let the rejection get them down. "Now we're going to look for someone else, whether it's another channel, whether it's Britbox or Netflix, because there's a massive audience for this." As of February 2023, there has been no update as to when or if the new series will be released.

Episodes

Cast

Main

Supporting

Home releases

Filming locations
Many of the places featured in Two Pints are real and are mostly in Runcorn :
 The Archer is the former Waterloo pub at 88 High Street in the Old Town area of Runcorn, near the canal, and for the series is renamed after the series' first script editor, Paul Mayhew-Archer, who was later replaced by Jon Brown. The Waterloo closed in December 2012, and has been converted into a Buddhist temple. (Series 1 features a second pub called The Mayhew, in reality the appropriately named, and as of 2021 still operating, Wellington.) The Waterloo is only used for the exterior shots whereas the interiors are recorded in the studio at BBC Television Centre in London. 
 The power station featured in the credits is Fiddlers Ferry Power Station in between the neighbouring towns of Widnes & Warrington
 Sayer's Bakery where Janet works is also real, being located at 30 Church Street, Runcorn Old Town. 
 Gaz's workshop (Formerly Brindley Autos) can be found on Brindley Street in the northwest of the town under one of the rail bridge's arches, now known as 'Arch Motor's'. 
 The Castle ruins featured in the opening title sequence are those of Halton Castle, in the east of the town. 
 The exterior of Gaz and Donna's flat is also real and can be found opposite the indoor market near Alcock Street and the bus station in the Old Town. 
 Janet and Jonny's house can be found at 9 Clarks Terrace, in the Weston Point area of Runcorn. 
 In Series 3, Episode 4 (Beastiality): Bridges Fish and Chip Shop is located on the junction of Brindley Street and Cawdor Street.  It is presently a Chinese takeaway by the name of Jacky Chen.  Louise and David are later seen walking apparently away from this location eating chips.  However, that scene was in fact shot on Picow Street (moving onto the bridge over the railway line).  In the subsequent shots Donna meets her mother outside the adjacent shop on Balfour Street, and Janet goes to purchase a second hand wedding dress at 3 Curzon Street, WA7 4PG.
 The Bank Chambers nightclub featured in the special musical flashback episode (When Janet Met Johnny): is presently Chambers Nightclub at 77 High St, WA7 1AH.

References

External links

 (Last updated March 2008)
Two Pints of Lager and a Packet of Crisps at the British TV Comedy Guide

2001 British television series debuts
2011 British television series endings
2000s British sex comedy television series
2000s British sitcoms
2010s British sex comedy television series
2010s British sitcoms
BBC television sitcoms
English-language television shows
Runcorn
Television series about couples
Television shows set in Cheshire